Boeri or Boéri is a surname. Notable people with the surname include:

Cini Boeri (1924–2020), Italian architect and designer
Daniel Boéri (born 1944), Monegasque sociologist and politician
Isabelle Boéri-Bégard (born 1960), French fencer
Michel Boeri, Monegasque motor sports manager
Petrus Boeri (14th century), Benedictive bishop
Stefano Boeri (born 1956), Italian architect and urban planner
Tito Boeri (born 1958), Italian economist and academic